The Akobo River is a river on the border between South Sudan and Ethiopia. The Pibor flows into the Sobat River, which in turn empties into the White Nile.

The tributaries of the Akobo river include the Cechi, the Chiarini, and the Owag, on the right or Ethiopian side; and the Neubari, Ajuba and Kaia on the left or South Sudanese side.

History 
The boundary between Sudan and Ethiopia was defined for the region near the Akobo River in 1899, by Major H.H. Austin and Major Charles W. Gwynn of the British Royal Engineers. They had no knowledge of the land, its inhabitants, or their languages, and were short on supplies. Rather than defining a line based on ethnic groups and traditional territories, essentially along the escarpment that separates the highlands and the plains, Majors Austin and Gwynn simply proposed drawing the line down the middle of the Akobo River and parts of the Pibor River and Baro River. This boundary was consummated in the Anglo-Ethiopian Treaty of 1902, resulting in an area in the Ethiopian Gambela Region called the Baro Salient.

The Baro Salient is more closely connected to South Sudan than Ethiopia, both in terms of natural features and people. The Baro Salient was used as a sanctuary by Sudanese insurgents during the country's long civil wars. It was difficult for Sudan to exert authority over a region that is part of Ethiopia, and Ethiopia was reluctant to police this remote region and become involved in the politics of Sudan's internal conflicts.

The Akobo has been the subject of several mining surveys. In 1939, engineers of COMINA carried out exploration of the Akobo and its tributaries. North-flowing tributaries appeared to be more promising than the south-flowing ones. Values up to 10 grams of gold per cubic meter were found in Chama creek, and the possible average value could be 0.7 g per cubic meter. In the period 1952-1954 the Ministry of Mines employed as many as 120 miners at a time. They produced an average of 1.66 grams of gold per day.

See also 

 List of rivers of South Sudan
 List of rivers of Ethiopia

References 

International rivers of Africa
Rivers of Ethiopia
Rivers of South Sudan
Sobat River
Ethiopia–South Sudan border
Ethiopian Highlands
Gambela Region
Jonglei State
Greater Upper Nile
Border rivers